Amselia leucozonellus is a moth in the family Crambidae. It was described by Walsingham and Hampson in 1896. It is found in Yemen.

References

Crambinae
Moths described in 1896
Moths of Asia